Extropianism, also referred to as the philosophy of extropy, is an "evolving framework of values and standards for continuously improving the human condition".
Extropians believe that advances in science and technology will some day let people live indefinitely. An extropian may wish to contribute to this goal, e.g. by doing research and development or by volunteering to test new technology.

Originated by a set of principles developed by the philosopher Max More, The Principles of Extropy, extropian thinking places strong emphasis on rational thinking and on practical optimism. According to More, these principles "do not specify particular beliefs, technologies, or policies". Extropians share an optimistic view of the future, expecting considerable advances in computational power, life extension, nanotechnology and the like.  Many extropians foresee the eventual realization of indefinite lifespans or immortality, and the recovery, thanks to future advances in biomedical technology or mind uploading, of those whose bodies/brains have been preserved by means of cryonics.

Extropy
The term extropy, as an antonym to "entropy" was used in a 1967 academic volume discussing cryogenics and in a 1978 academic volume of cybernetics.  Diane Duane in 1983 was the first to use the term "extropy" to signify a potential transhuman destiny for humanity. Also published in 1983 was J. Neil Schulman's Prometheus Award winning novel, The Rainbow Cadenza which used the term "extropic" as a type of scale in visual music. 'Extropy' as coined by Tom Bell (T.O. Morrow) and defined by Max More in 1988, is "the extent of a living or organizational system's intelligence, functional order, vitality, energy, life, experience, and capacity and drive for improvement and growth." Extropy is not a rigorously defined technical term in philosophy or science; in a metaphorical sense, it simply expresses the opposite of entropy.

Extropy Institute
In 1986, More joined Alcor, a cryonics company, and helped establish (along with Michael Price, Garret Smyth and Luigi Warren) the first European cryonics organization, Mizar Limited (later Alcor UK). In 1987, More moved to Los Angeles from Oxford University in England to work on his Ph.D. in philosophy at the University of Southern California.

In 1988, Extropy: The Journal of Transhumanist Thought was first published. (For the first few issues, it was "Extropy: Vaccine for Future Shock".) This brought together thinkers with interests in artificial intelligence, nanotechnology, genetic engineering, life extension, mind uploading, idea futures, robotics, space exploration, memetics, and the politics and economics of transhumanism. Alternative media organizations soon began reviewing the magazine, and it attracted interest from like-minded thinkers.  Later, More and Bell co-founded the Extropy Institute, a non-profit 501(c)(3) educational organization.  "ExI" was formed as a transhumanist networking and information center to use current scientific understanding along with critical and creative thinking to define a small set of principles or values that could help make sense of new capabilities opening up to humanity.

The Extropy Institute's email list was launched in 1991 (and, as of April 2015, continues to exist as "Extropy-Chat"), and in 1992 the institute began producing the first conferences on transhumanism. Affiliate members throughout the world began organizing their own transhumanist groups. Extro Conferences, meetings, parties, on-line debates, and documentaries continue to spread transhumanism to the public.

In 2006, the board of directors of the Extropy Institute made a decision to close the organisation, stating that its mission was "essentially completed."

Extropism
Extropism is a derivation of the transhumanist philosophy of extropianism. It follows the same tradition - hence the similarity in naming - but has been revised to better suit the perceived paradigms of the 21st century. As introduced in The Extropist Manifesto, it promotes an optimistic futuristic philosophy that can be summed up in the following five phrases, which spell out the word "EXTROPISM":

Endless eXtension
Transcending Restriction
Overcoming Property
Intelligence
Smart Machines

Extropists desire to prolong their life span to a near-immortal state and exist in a world where artificial intelligence and robotics have made work irrelevant. As in utilitarianism, the purpose of one's life should be to increase the overall happiness of all creatures on Earth through cooperation.

The Extropist Manifesto was written by web entrepreneur Breki Tomasson and writer Hank Pellissier - both of whom have had a long transhuman interest - in January, 2010. It details the ways in which extropism has evolved away from extropianism, while continuing to build upon its original tenets. For example, it moves away from the original Extropian Principles by placing a significant focus on the need to abolish and/or restrict the current use of surveillance, copyright and patent laws.

See also

 Biopunk movement
 Cyborg anthropology
 Democratic transhumanism
 Eclipse Phase, a tabletop game which uses the philosophy in its futuristic setting.
 Futures studies
 Holism
 Omega Point
 Meliorism
 Negentropy
 Posthuman
 Proactionary Principle
 Sustainability
 Systems philosophy
 Systems thinking
 Transhumanism

References

External links
 Kevin Kelly on Extropy - Kevin Kelly at The Technium, August 29, 2009
 

 
Transhumanism
Philosophy of life
Virtue ethics